Leeuwenhoekiella aequorea  is a bacterium from the genus of Leeuwenhoekiella.

References

External links
Type strain of Leeuwenhoekiella aequorea at BacDive -  the Bacterial Diversity Metadatabase

Flavobacteria
Bacteria described in 2005
Leeuwenhoekiella